Campuloclinium is a genus of flowering plants in the family Asteraceae.

 Species
Campuloclinium is native to Mesoamerica and South America.

References

Eupatorieae
Asteraceae genera